This is a list of French ambassadors to England. Note that during much of this period there was no set ambassador, with frequent periods of lagging relations.

 1526–1535 : Charles de Solier, comte de Morette
 1535–1537 : Antoine de Castelnau
 1537–1538 : Louis de Perreau, Sieur de Castillon
 1538–1543 : Charles de Marillac
 1543–1546 : Aymar Chaste
 1546–1548 : Odet de Selve
 1553–1556 : Antoine, 1st comte de Noailles
 Oct 1556–1560 : Gilles de Noailles (as French agent)
 Feb 1560–1562 : Michel de Sèvre (Ambassador Extraordinary)
 Nov 1561/21 Feb 1562–1566 : Paul de Foix de Carmain
 1566–1568 : Jacques Bochetel de la Forest
 1568–1574 : Bertrand de Salignac de la Mothe-Fénelon
 1574–1584 : Michel de Castelnau

 1585–1589 : Guillaume de L'Aubespine
 1589–1592 : Aymar Chaste
 1602–1606 : Christophe de Harlay, Count of Beaumont
 1606–1613 : Antoine Lefèvre de la Boderie
 1611–1615 : Samuel Spifame, Sieur des Bisseaux
 1615–1618 : Gaspard Dauvet, Sieur des Marets
 1618–1621 : Honoré d'Albret de Cadenet
 1625–1625 : Jean de Varigniez, Sieur de Blainville
 1626–1627 : François de Bassompierre
 1629–1630 : Charles de L'Aubespine
 1630–1633 : François du Val de Fontenay-Mareuil
 1633–1635 : Jean d'Angennes, Marquis de Poygni
 1635–1637 : Henri I de Saint-Nectaire
 1637–1640 : Pompone de Bellièvre
 1640–1641 : Jean de Montereul
 1641–1643 : Jacques d'Estampes de La Ferté-Imbert
 1645–1650 : Jean de Montereul
 1652–1660 : Antoine de Bordeaux, seigneur de Neufville
 1661–1662 : Godefroi, Comte d'Estrades
 1662–1665 : François de Comminges
 1665–1668 : Henri, Duke of Verneuil
 1668–1674 : Charles Colbert, Marquis de Croissy 
 1674–1677 : Henri de Massue, 1st Marquis de Rouvigny
 1677–1688 : Paul Barillon

See also
List of ambassadors of France to the Kingdom of Great Britain
List of ambassadors of France to the United Kingdom

References

England
 List
Ambassadors